Sally Wofford Airport  is a privately owned public-use airport in Poinsett County, Arkansas, United States. It is located three nautical miles (4 mi, 6 km) south of the central business district of Weiner, Arkansas.

Facilities and aircraft 
Sally Wofford Airport covers an area of 15 acres (6 ha) at an elevation of 245 feet (75 m) above mean sea level. It has one runway designated 1/19 with an asphalt and turf surface measuring 2,330 by 160 feet (710 x 49 m). For the 12-month period ending July 18, 2010, the airport had 25,130 general aviation aircraft operations, an average of 68 per day.

References

External links 
 Aerial image as of 28 February 2000 from USGS The National Map

Airports in Arkansas
Transportation in Poinsett County, Arkansas